Aurelija Tamašauskaitė (born 22 May 1996) is a Lithuanian modern pentathlete. She began competing in 2011. Tamašauskaitė represented Lithuania at the 2022 European Modern Pentathlon Championships, where she won bronze medal in women's team event.

References

External links
 

1996 births
Living people
Lithuanian female modern pentathletes
Modern pentathletes at the 2014 Summer Youth Olympics
21st-century Lithuanian women